Martin Coleman is an Irish retired hurler.

Martin Coleman may also refer to:

Other sportspeople
Martin Coleman, Junior, Irish sportsperson
Martin Coleman (American football), played in 2007 USC Trojans football team

Others
Martyn Coleman (screenwriter) on Drama at Ten
Martin Coleman (songwriter) on New Ways but Love Stays
Martin Coleman, leader of Satellite IRG
Martin Coleman (Mr and Mrs Smith), fictional character in 2005 film